Dhakaiya Mastan is a 2002 Bangladeshi film starring Manna and Moushumi. The film was directed by Montazur Rahman Akbar. It also co-stars Misha Sawdagar and Dipjol. It was remake of 2001 Hindi film Farz.

Cast 
 Manna
 Moushumi
 Dipjol - Billal Mishouri
Shahin Alam
Dolly Johur 
Nasir Khan
Ilias Kobra
Habibur Rahman Modhu
Moiyuri
Razzak
Misha Sawdagor

References

External links
 

2002 films
Bengali-language Bangladeshi films
2000s Bengali-language films
Bangladeshi remakes of Indian films
Films directed by Montazur Rahman Akbar